Hoshizora no Live: The Best of Acoustic Ballade is Misia's first live album, released on October 22, 2003. It sold 72,351 copies in its first week and peaked at #2. The album features live recordings of Misia's outdoor acoustic concert held in Okinawa on August 15 and 16, 2003.

The album is certified Platinum for shipment of 250,000 copies.

Track listing

Charts

Oricon Sales Chart

Physical Sales Charts

References

External links
Sony Music Online Japan : MISIA

Misia albums
2003 live albums